The Austin Pangburn House is a historic house at Main and Austin Streets in Pangburn, Arkansas.  It is a -story wood-frame structure, with irregular massing typical of the Queen Anne period.  It has a hip roof, with projecting gables that are finished in bands of decoratively cut wooden shingles, with novelty siding on the rest of the house.  A porch wraps around two sides, supported by Doric columns.  Built c. 1908, it is a well-preserved example of period construction in White County.

The house was listed on the National Register of Historic Places in 1991.

See also
National Register of Historic Places listings in White County, Arkansas

References

Houses on the National Register of Historic Places in Arkansas
Houses completed in 1908
Houses in White County, Arkansas
National Register of Historic Places in White County, Arkansas
1908 establishments in Arkansas
Queen Anne architecture in Arkansas